The Long Shadow is a 1949 novel from Australian author Jon Cleary. Cleary had just written his debut work, You Can't See 'Round Corners and was unsure what to do as a follow up. His editor Graham Greene suggested he try his hand at a thriller "because it will teach you the art of narrative and it will teach you the uses of brevity."

Plot
The plot revolves around Martin Brown, an educated man who is living as a swagman. He is falsely accused of murder of a woman called Ruth Taylor, and is pursued through the Australian countryside by police and other men. He falls in love with a woman who believes his innocence.

Reception
Reviews were not as strong as that for Cleary's first novel.

Proposed film
In 1968 it was announced that a movie version was to be made starring Rod Taylor for Ajax Films from a script by James Workman but no film resulted.

References

External links
The Long Shadow at AustLit (subscription required)

1949 Australian novels
Novels by Jon Cleary